Aksaz may refer to:

 Aksaz, Biga
 Aksaz, Kuyucak
 Aksaz, Manavgat
 Aksaz Naval Base